Lost Art Press is a publisher of books and videos for woodworkers and hand tool collectors and is based in Covington, Kentucky. It was established in 2007 by Christopher Schwarz and John Hoffman. The company publishes works that help the modern woodworker learn traditional hand-tool skills as they attempt to restore the balance between hand and machine work by unearthing the so-called "lost arts" of hand skills and explaining how they can be integrated with the machinery in the modern shop to help produce furniture that is crisp, well-proportioned, stout and quickly made.

"The Anarchist's Tool Chest," written by Christopher Schwarz, paints a world where woodworking tools are at the center of an ethical life filled with creating furniture that will last for generations. It makes the case that you can build almost anything with a kit of fewer than 50 high-quality tools, and it shows you how to select real working tools, regardless of their vintage or brand name and guides you in building a proper chest for your toolkit that follows the ancient rules that have been forgotten or ignored.

The "anarchism" mentioned in the title is individualist anarchism, specifically "aesthetic anarchism".

References

External links
Company Homepage

Publishing companies of the United States
Publishing companies established in 2007